Liparteliani is a Georgian surname. Notable people with the surname include:

Badri Liparteliani (born 1996), Georgian rugby union player
Soso Liparteliani (born 1971), Georgian judoka
Varlam Liparteliani (born 1989), Georgian judoka

Georgian-language surnames
Surnames of Georgian origin